Herbert Hoover Middle School can refer to:

 Herbert Hoover Middle School, Long Beach Unified School District
 Herbert Hoover Middle School (San Francisco), California
 Herbert Hoover Middle School (San Jose, California)
 Herbert Hoover Middle School (Potomac, Maryland)
 Herbert Hoover Middle School, Edison Township Public Schools, New Jersey
 Herbert Hoover Middle School, Kenmore-Town of Tonawanda School District, New York